Miller Genuine Draft 400 may refer to:

 Miller Genuine Draft 400 (Michigan), at Michigan International Speedway from 1990 to 1995 
 Miller Genuine Draft 400 (Richmond), at Richmond International Raceway from 1990 to 1995

See also
Miller 400 (disambiguation)
Miller High Life 400 (disambiguation)